Lloyd Eugene Stallworth (April 15, 1941 – October 27, 2002), also known as Baby Lloyd, was an American singer, songwriter, musician, recording artist, choreographer and dancer who was a member of the R&B vocal group The Famous Flames on King Records from 1958 to 1967. Stallworth was posthumously inducted into the Rock and Roll Hall of Fame in 2012 as a member of The Famous Flames.

Biography 
Stallworth was born in Fort Lauderdale, Florida, in 1941. In 1957, he was employed by James Brown as his valet and part-time driver. Stallworth's mother arranged the job in order to keep her son 'out of trouble'.

The Famous Flames 
In 1957, when Stallworth was sixteen, James Brown and the Famous Flames was breaking up; Bobby Byrd (founder), Sylvester Keels, NaFloyd Scott, Nash Knox, and Johnny Terry had left because the group's managers, Clint Brantley and Ben Bart, gave James Brown top billing. Over the next few months, several members came and went, including Willie Johnson, Big Bill Hollings, J. W. Archer and Louis Madison. These men, after departing the group, went on to form a San Francisco-based splinter group, The Fabulous Flames. Members of this interim Famous Flames singing group claimed they had left because Brown refused to pay them. Brown said they were asked to leave because of alcohol and drug use while touring. By this time, with the departure of original group leader/founder Bobby Byrd, Brown had taken full control of The Famous Flames. In 1958, Stallworth was recruited as a replacement group member. He was nicknamed Baby Lloyd because he was the youngest member of the group. Bobby Bennett, along with original members Bobby Byrd and Johnny Terry also rejoined, and with James Brown, became the permanent Famous Flames lineup.

Performances 
Stallworth sang with the group on several hit singles, including "Bewildered", "Good Good Lovin'", "This Old Heart", "I Don't Mind",  "Think", "I'll Go Crazy", "Three Hearts in a Tangle", and "Oh Baby Don't You Weep" and co-wrote Brown's 1961 hit, "Lost Someone". He recorded several albums with the group, including the million-selling Top 10 album "Live at The Apollo" (1963). This album was incorrectly marketed by King Records as a "James Brown" album, when, in reality, it was an album by James Brown & The Famous Flames . It was not until the release of the CD, however, that The Famous Flames were credited for their work on the album. Other albums included   Pure Dynamite! Live at the Royal (another Billboard Top 10 success), Think, Showtime, and James Brown and The Famous Flames Live at the Garden. Stallworth performed solo spots in Brown's revue as an opening act and recorded a couple of Brown-produced solo songs.

As an artist in his own right, Stallworth released just a handful of singles: "I Need You" for Dade/Atco Records (1960) and "There's Something on Your Mind" for Loma Records (2014). He also recorded a single for the small Hollywood-based "Wolfie" label, entitled "I Refuse To Cry" (W-101) and made an appearance on the Smash Records live album, Presenting...The James Brown Show (SRS-67087-1967) where he, along with several James Brown Revue artists, including Vicki Anderson, sang two songs. One of them was "(I Can't Get No) Satisfaction".

Stallworth appeared with James Brown and The Famous Flames in the 1964 American International Pictures concert film The T.A.M.I. Show, recorded live at the Santa Monica Civic Auditorium, where they upstaged headliners The Rolling Stones. He also appeared with the group in the Frankie Avalon film, Ski Party (1965), and on a 1966 telecast of The Ed Sullivan Show on CBS .

In 1966, James Brown made two appearances on The Ed Sullivan Show, both with The Famous Flames. Stallworth was with the group on the first appearance (May 1, 1966), but he left the group before the second (October 30, 1966). Only Brown was given billing or payment (the group members were salaried) and this caused discord within the group. In 2012, in an interview published in Goldmine, Bobby Bennett said, 
"Ed Sullivan couldn't believe what he was seeing, but we never got paid...James Brown took all that money." 
and
"Every time one of the Flames left, it was on account of money. (Brown) didn't want to pay the money that was supposed to be paid to us. He stiffed the heck out of us man. (Brown's family), now they're fighting over our (the Flames') money. We got money out there and still can't receive it. We're owed so much money, it ain't funny."
and
"We never got paid for that film (Ski Party), and we filmed every day".

By 1968, Byrd and Bennett had also left, effectively spelling the end of the Famous Flames. Byrd returned for a time, then left permanently in 1973. Brown's career continued successfully in the funk genre.

In 2012, on the eve of the group's 2012 Rock and Roll Hall of Fame induction, Bobby Bennett, the last surviving member of the group, said in an interview with The Cleveland Plain Dealer newspaper, "Every time one of The Flames left, it was because of money. James wanted all of the money for himself, and we wanted to get paid our money".

Litigation 
In 2002, along with band member Fred Wesley, Flames members Stallworth, Bobby Byrd, and Bobby Bennett retained Richard Yellen, an attorney, to begin legal proceedings against James Brown for alleged non-payment of royalties. The lawsuit was filed in the New York state supreme court on October 31, 2002, and then in the Manhattan federal court. Baby Lloyd and Bobby Bennett sought $7 million, Byrd $5 million (and $2 million for his wife, singer Vicki (Anderson) Byrd) as royalties from the 1960s and 1970s. The lawsuit was dismissed because the statute of limitations had expired.

Rock and Roll Hall of Fame controversy 
In 1986, James Brown was inducted as one of the charter members of The Rock and Roll Hall of Fame without The Famous Flames. This led to long lasting controversy over the following 27 years.

In 2011, eleven years after Stallworth's death, five years after Bobby Byrd's death, and seven years after John Terry's death, Terry Stewart, the chief executive officer of the Rock and Roll Hall of Fame, formed a Special Committee to consider the bands and groups that had been eligible for induction, but were left out because of the impact of their lead singers or front men. Concerning the omission of the Flames when Brown was inducted alone in 1986, Stewart said, "There was no legislative intent [as to] why they (the Famous Flames) weren't included; somehow, they just got overlooked."

The Famous Flames (Byrd, Bennett, Terry and Stallworth) received their induction in Cleveland, on April 14, 2012. Bennett, who died the following year, (January 18, 2013), as the group's only surviving member, accepted the induction on behalf of The Famous Flames. At the same time, The Midnighters (Hank Ballard), The Comets (Bill Haley), The Crickets (Buddy Holly), The Blue Caps (Gene Vincent) and The Miracles (Smokey Robinson), received their induction, Miracles lead singer Smokey Robinson, who inducted all six groups, including his own Miracles, said,

"These people do not stand behind you. They stand with you." "These are not backing groups. These are the groups."
and; 
"If James Brown was the hardest working man in show business, The Famous Flames were the hardest working group."

Legacy 
King Records never put The Famous Flames' faces on any of their album covers (only Brown was pictured). This limited their future market potential. For a short time, after leaving The Famous Flames, Stallworth took a position as a member of James Brown's clerical staff. Stallworth died in 2002, at the age of 61, from complications of diabetes. (Some sources report 2001 as his year of death).

Choreographer Codie Wiggins played Famous Flame "Baby Lloyd" Stallworth (in an uncredited role) in the 2014 biopic, "Get on Up" that was released in theatres nationwide on August 1, 2014.
In 2020, "Baby Lloyd" Stallworth was posthumously inducted with the rest of The Famous Flames' members Bobby Byrd, Bobby Bennett, and Johnny Terry into the National Rhythm and Blues Hall of Fame, some seven years after the induction of Flames lead singer James Brown into the same organization.

References

External links 

 The Famous Flames on the Future Rock Hall website
 James Brown introduces The Famous Flames, including "Baby Lloyd" Stallworth, in a clip from the 1965 American International Pictures film, "Ski Party"
 
 .

The Famous Flames members
1941 births
Musicians from Fort Lauderdale, Florida
King Records artists
American soul singers
James Brown vocalists
American rhythm and blues singer-songwriters
African-American male dancers
African-American dancers
American male dancers
American organists
American male organists
2002 deaths
20th-century American male singers
20th-century American singers
African-American male singers
Singer-songwriters from Florida